Harold Edward Booth (October 30, 1911 – December 6, 1970) was a Democratic member of the California State Assembly from the 4th district from 1963 to 1965.

Early life 
Booth was born on October 30, 1911, in Soldier, Kansas. He lived in California for most of his life.

Political career 
Booth won the 4th State Assembly district election in 1962, narrowly beating Republican candidate Ray E. Johnson. He lost to Johnson two years later, in 1964.

Sources

1911 births
1970 deaths
Democratic Party members of the California State Assembly
People from Orland, California
People from Jackson County, Kansas
20th-century American politicians